Boolaroo is a suburb of Greater Newcastle, city of Lake Macquarie, New South Wales, Australia, located  west of Newcastle's central business district in Lake Macquarie's West Ward.

It was the epicenter of the 1989 Newcastle earthquake. Boolaroo borders a number of well-known towns and suburbs within the Lake Macquarie Region, including Warners Bay and Speers Point, and, for a small strip of land, fronts onto Lake Macquarie itself.

Within Boolaroo is Cockle Creek railway station, a small station on the Central Coast & Newcastle Line. Also, Boolaroo previously housed a lead/zinc smelter, owned by the former Pasminco (now Zinifex) however the site has been cleared since the smelter ceased operations in 2003.

Boolaroo is home to several churches, of various denominations, as well as Boolaroo Public School, a library, a cinema (which was partially destroyed in the 1989 Newcastle earthquake) and a number of shops, including a small supermarket and a military disposal store.

History 
The Aboriginal people, in this area, the Awabakal, were the first people of this land.

See also
Boolaroo Racecourse

References

External links
 History of Boolaroo (Lake Macquarie City Library)

Suburbs of Lake Macquarie